Heera Bhai (25 December 1922 – 25 December 1995) was an Indian politician from Janata Dal. He was a member of 6th Lok Sabha and 9th Lok Sabha from Banswara constituency in Rajasthan. He started his political career in 1957 when he was elected to Rajasthan Legislative Assembly. In 1960 he was elected as First Mayor of  Agra Municipal Corporation . Bhai died in Rajasthan on his 73rd birthday on 25 December 1995.

References

1922 births
1995 deaths
India MPs 1977–1979
India MPs 1989–1991
Janata Party politicians
Samyukta Socialist Party politicians
Janata Dal politicians
Bharatiya Lok Dal politicians
People from Banswara district
Lok Sabha members from Rajasthan
Rajasthan MLAs 1957–1962